Milan Savić (born 19 May 2000) is a Bosnian professional footballer who plays as a winger for Serbian SuperLiga club Čukarički.

Savić started his professional career at Čukarički.

Club career

Early career
Savić started playing football at his hometown club Radnik Bijeljina, before joining youth academy of Serbian team Red Star Belgrade in 2014. In 2018, he moved to youth setup of Belgian side Mechelen.

In January 2020, Savić signed with Čukarički. He made his professional debut against Inđija on 6 June at the age of 20. On 11 September, he scored his first professional goal.

International career
Savić represented Bosnia and Herzegovina at all youth levels.

Career statistics

Club

References

External links

2000 births
Living people
People from Bijeljina
Serbs of Bosnia and Herzegovina
Bosnia and Herzegovina footballers
Bosnia and Herzegovina youth international footballers
Bosnia and Herzegovina under-21 international footballers
Bosnia and Herzegovina expatriate footballers
Association football wingers
FK Čukarički players
Serbian SuperLiga players
Expatriate footballers in Serbia
Bosnia and Herzegovina expatriate sportspeople in Serbia